The 2019 ZLM Tour was the 32nd edition of the ZLM Tour cycling stage race. It started on 19 June in Yerseke and ended on 23 June in Tilburg and was a part of the 2019 UCI Europe Tour as a 2.1-ranked event.

Teammate Amund Grøndahl Jansen finished second, and Mads Würtz Schmidt of Katusha–Alpecin rounded out the podium. Dylan Groenewegen of  took the points classification, Rasmus Byriel Iversen of  took the young rider classification, and  took the teams classification.

Teams
Seventeen teams, which consisted of four UCI WorldTeams, six Professional Continental Teams, and seven UCI Continental Teams, competed in the race. Of the 115 riders who started the race, only 101 riders finished the race.

UCI WorldTeams

 
 
 
 

UCI Professional Continental Teams

 
 
 
 
 
 

UCI Continental Teams

 
 
 Monkey Town Continental Team
 
 
 
 Vlasman CT

Route

Stages

Prologue
19 June 2019 – Yerseke to Yerseke,

Stage 1
20 June 2019 – Bredene to Heinkenszand,

Stage 2
21 June 2019 – Etten-Leur to Buchten,

Stage 3
22 June 2019 – Buchten to Landgraaf, 

The stage was shortened after the race jury decided to finish the race a lap early after the police raised concerns about the level of traffic on the finishing circuit.

Stage 4
23 June 2019 – Eindhoven to Tilburg,

Classification leadership table

In the 2019 ZLM Tour, three jerseys were awarded. The general classification was calculated by adding each cyclist's finishing times on each stage. Time bonuses were awarded to the first three finishers on all stages except for the individual time trial: the stage winner won a ten-second bonus, with six and four seconds for the second and third riders respectively. Bonus seconds were also awarded to the first three riders at intermediate sprints – three seconds for the winner of the sprint, two seconds for the rider in second and one second for the rider in third. The leader of the general classification received a yellow jersey. This classification was considered the most important of the 2019 ZLM Tour, and the winner of the classification was considered the winner of the race.

The second classification was the points classification. Riders were awarded points for finishing in the top ten in a stage. Unlike in the points classification in the Tour de France, the winners of all stages were awarded the same number of points. Points were also won in intermediate sprints; three points for crossing the sprint line first, two points for second place, and one for third. The leader of the points classification was awarded a blue jersey.

The third jersey represented the young rider classification, marked by a white jersey. Only riders born after 1 January 1997 were eligible; the young rider best placed in the general classification was the leader of the young rider classification.

Final classifications

General classification

Points classification

Young rider classification

Teams classification

References

Sources

External links 

Ster ZLM Toer
Zlm Tour
Zlm Tour
Zlm Tour
Cycling in Limburg (Netherlands)
Cycling in North Brabant
Cycling in Zeeland
Cycling in Borsele
Cycling in Eindhoven
Cycling in Sittard-Geleen
Sports competitions in Tilburg
Sport in West Flanders
Sport in Etten-Leur
Sport in Landgraaf
Sport in Reimerswaal
Bredene